Standings and results for Group 2 of the UEFA Euro 2004 qualifying tournament.

Group 2 consisted of Bosnia-Herzegovina, Denmark, Luxembourg, Norway and Romania. Denmark won the group, having finished a point clear of joint second-placed teams Norway and Romania. Norway qualified for the playoffs due to a better head-to-head record against Romania.

Standings

Matches

Goalscorers

References
UEFA Page
RSSSF Page

Group 2
2002–03 in Bosnia and Herzegovina football
2003–04 in Bosnia and Herzegovina football
2002–03 in Danish football
Qual
2002–03 in Romanian football
2003–04 in Romanian football
2002–03 in Luxembourgian football
2003–04 in Luxembourgian football
2002 in Norwegian football
2003 in Norwegian football